Gymnoscelis nigrescens is a moth in the family Geometridae. It was described by William Warren in 1898. It is found on the Kai Islands.

References

Moths described in 1898
nigrescens